Netherlands competed at the 2022 European Athletics Championships in Munich, Germany, between 15 and 21 August 2022

Medallists

Results

Netherlands has qualified 27 male and 34 female athletes.

Men  

 Track and road events

 Field events

Combined events – Decathlon

Women  

 Track and road events

 Field events

 Combined events – Heptathlon

References

External links
European Athletics Championships

Nations at the 2022 European Athletics Championships
European Championships in Athletics
2022